This is a list of mayors of the city of Saratoga Springs, New York.  Mayors have been sworn in on the first day of the year of even-numbered years.  Saratoga Springs was incorporated as a city in 1915.

Mayors

References

Mayors
Saratoga Springs